Pond Hill is a summit located in Central New York Region of New York located in the Town of Annsville in Oneida County, west-northwest of Taberg.

References

Mountains of Oneida County, New York
Mountains of New York (state)